"Guilty" is a 1974 song by British vocal duo The Pearls. It was the group's final charting single in the UK.

"Guilty" reached No. 10 on the UK Singles Chart.  It became their greatest hit.

The song was included on a 2005 compilation of the group's hits entitled, A String of Pearls.

"Guilty" was also covered by American girl group First Choice.  Their version reached #103 in the U.S. and became a Top 20 R&B hit.

Charts
The Pearls

First Choice

References

External links
 Lyrics of this song
 
 

1974 singles
1974 songs
Bell Records singles
The Pearls songs
First Choice songs
Songs written by Ron Roker
Songs written by Gerry Shury